Lélouma (Pular : 𞤂𞤫𞥅𞤤𞤵𞤥𞤢𞥄) is a town located in west central Guinea. It is the capital of Lélouma Prefecture.

Population 5,457 (2008 est).

References

Sub-prefectures of the Labé Region